Xiangling Township is a township of Jinyang County, Sichuan, China. , it administers the following seven villages:
Xiazhai Village
Shangzhai Village
Tasha Village
Celuo Village
Deji Village
Danhongzi Village
Huluping Village

See also
List of township-level divisions of Sichuan

References

Township-level divisions of Sichuan
Jinyang County